AFCW may refer to one of the following English association football clubs:

 A.F.C. Wallingford
 AFC Wimbledon
 A.F.C. Wulfrunians

Or to the film:
 A Fish Called Wanda

Other:
 United States Air Force Academy Cadet Wing